Qazaxlar  is a village and municipality in the Fuzuli District of Azerbaijan. It has a population of 843.

References 

Populated places in Fuzuli District